Jason Jarvis (born 2 October 2000) is a Scottish professional footballer who plays for the University of Stirling in the Lowland League.

Career
Jarvis made his senior debut for Falkirk on 29 December 2018, in a 2–4 league defeat against Dunfermline Athletic.

References

2000 births
Living people
Scottish footballers
Falkirk F.C. players
Scottish Professional Football League players
Association football midfielders
University of Stirling F.C. players